MDM Recordings Inc. is a Canadian independent record label, distributor and artist management company founded by 2014 Canadian Country Music Association Record Company Person of the Year Mike Denney and distributed through Universal Music Canada.

Founded in 2008 and based in Toronto, Ontario, MDM Recordings works primarily with Canadian Country music artists such as Juno Award nominee Chad Brownlee, 2014 CCMA Female Artist of the Year Jess Moskaluke and 2014 CCMA Discovery Award winners The Lovelocks.

MDM Recordings partnered with award-winning producer/musician Mitch Merrett in 2009, and launched new music publishing business Little Red Bungalow in partnership with CCS Rights Management in 2012. In 2014, MDM Recordings expanded operations to Australia with a new partnership with the Maven Agency (distributed by Sony Music Australia) as well as the United States through the addition of Nashville-based representative Chad Green.

In August 2014, Jess Moskaluke's single "Cheap Wine and Cigarettes" was certified Gold by Music Canada, marking a first for MDM Recordings, and making her the first solo female Canadian Country artist to achieve this milestone since Shania Twain.

In October 2014, MDM Recordings announced the first cross-Canada tour composed entirely of MDM Recordings artists. Chad Brownlee's headlining "When The Lights Go Down Tour", supported by Jess Moskaluke and Bobby Wills, will travelled coast-to-coast beginning in March 2015.

Artists
Don Amero
Black Whiskey Mountain Rebellion
Five Roses
David James
Charlie Major
Tyler Joe Miller
Jess Moskaluke

Past artists
Chad Brownlee
Tim Chaisson
Hayley
The Lovelocks
Beverley Mahood
Bryce Pallister
Bobby Wills

References

External links
MDM Recordings Official Website

Record labels established in 2008
Canadian independent record labels
Canadian country music record labels